Meyerson is a surname.

Notable people with the surname include:

 A. Frederick Meyerson (1918–2009), New York politician and judge
 Agda Meyerson (1866–1924), Swedish nurse and healthcare profession activist
 Bernard S. Meyerson (born 1954), American physicist
 Charlie Meyerson, American journalist
 Émile Meyerson (1859–1933), Polish-born French chemist and philosopher of science
 Golda Meyerson, better known as Golda Meir (1898–1978), Russian-born Israeli politician
 Harold Meyerson (born 1950), American columnist
 Jin Meyerson (born 1972), American painter
 Jonah Meyerson (born 1991), American actor
 Morton Meyerson (born 1938), American businessman

See also
Morton H. Meyerson Symphony Center in Dallas, Texas
Meyerson Hall of the University of Pennsylvania, housing its School of Design
Meyerson convention a defensive bidding convention in bridge
Myerson
Meyer (disambiguation)

Jewish surnames
Yiddish-language surnames